A Morgadinha dos Canaviais is a 1949 Portuguese film directed by Caetano Bonucci and Amadeu Ferrari, featuring Eunice Muñoz as Madalena and Maria Matos as Vitória.

The film is based on the romance novel of the same name by Portuguese novelist Júlio Dinis, published in 1868. Set in the nineteenth century, the story revolves around Madalena Constança, a girl of great beauty and generosity.

Cast
Eunice Muñoz	... 	Madalena, Morgada dos Canaviais (majorat owner)
Fernando Isidoro	... 	Taberneiro
Paiva Raposo	... 	Henrique de Souzelas
Tomás de Macedo	... 	Augusto
Vitor Manuel	... 	Eduardo
Helena do Vale	... 	Cristina
Costinha	... 	Morgado das Perdizes (a majorat owner)
Auzenda Maria	... 	Mariana
Maria Matos	... 	D. Vitória
Joaquim Miranda	... 	Cancela
Jorge Moreira	... 	Angelo
Maria Olguim	... 	Catarina
Maria Emilia Vilas	... 	Maria de Jesus Doroteia, Madalena's aunt
Alfredo Henriques	... 	Seabra

External links
 

1949 films
1940s Portuguese-language films
Portuguese romantic drama films
1949 romantic drama films
Portuguese black-and-white films
Films set in the 19th century